October Group may refer to:

 International Communist League (Vietnam)
 October Group (constructivism)